Ironside is an unincorporated community in Malheur County, Oregon, United States. Ironside has a post office with ZIP Code 97908.

Climate
According to the Köppen Climate Classification system, Ironside has a semi-arid climate, abbreviated "BSk" on climate maps.

References

External links
Photos of Ironside from Panoramio

Unincorporated communities in Malheur County, Oregon
Unincorporated communities in Oregon